Jagodnik is a small settlement in the Municipality of Mokronog-Trebelno in southeastern Slovenia. The municipality lies in the historical region of Lower Carniola and is now included in the Southeast Slovenia Statistical Region.

History
Jagodnik was a hamlet of Podturn until 2000, when it was administratively separated and made a settlement in its own right.

References

External links
Jagodnik on Geopedia

Populated places in the Municipality of Mokronog-Trebelno
Populated places established in 2000